Who's Your Father is a 1935 British comedy film directed by Lupino Lane and starring Lane, Peter Haddon and Nita Harvey. It is a musical marriage mix-up film based on an original play by Mark Melford called Turned Up. Turned Up was a farce in three acts first produced in 1886 as Too Much Married and quickly re-named Turned Up. In 1926 Wylie-Tate produced a stage musical adaption by Arthur Rigby starring Lupino Lane and Mark Melford's nephew, Jack Melford.

Cast
 Lupino Lane as George Medway   
 Peter Haddon as Frank Steadley  
 Nita Harvey as Bina Medway   
 Jean Kent as Mary Radcliffe (credited as Joan Kent) 
 Margaret Yard as Mrs. Medway  
 James Carew as Elmer J. Radcliffe  
 Peter Gawthorne as Captain Medway 
 James Finlayson  as cast member
 Eva Hudson as cast member

References

Bibliography
Russell, Virginia. The Illegitimate Adventures of a Theatrical Eccentric. Mistry Press, 2017.

External links
 

1935 films
1935 comedy films
British comedy films
Films directed by Lupino Lane
British black-and-white films
1930s English-language films
1930s British films